Tango Ya Ba Wendo  is a 1992 documentary film.

Synopsis 
Tango Ya Ba Wendo is the name given to the 40s and 50s in Kinshasa, Democratic Republic of the Congo, a time when Antoine Kolosoyi, called Wendo, the pioneer of Zairian rumba, triumphed. In 1992, Wendo is almost 70 years old. The old singer and adventurer tells of his life, his mother as a traditional singer, his first job – as a mechanic, his beginning in songs during colonial times, followed by success and then oblivion.

Award 
 FesPaCO 1993

External links 

1992 films
Creative Commons-licensed documentary films
Democratic Republic of the Congo documentary films
1992 documentary films
Documentary films about African music